Churchill Lake is a glacial lake in the north-west part of the Canadian province of Saskatchewan. Frobisher Lake flows in from the north while Peter Pond Lake flows in from the east through the Kisis Channel. Highway 155 crosses this channel at the village of Buffalo Narrows .

It is part of the Churchill River drainage basin. As the source of the Churchill River, the length of the river  is measured from the north end of the lake to the Hudson Bay. The lake can freeze from as early as November and remain frozen till May.

Historic map 

John Franklin's Coppermine Expedition map of 1819–1822 shows details of the fur trade route from Île-à-la-Crosse to Methye Portage. Churchill Lake is shown as Clear Lake with its northern reaches still unknown.	
Also not yet surveyed are the waters of Wasekamio Lake, Turnor Lake then Frobisher Lake that flow from the north into Churchill Lake.	
From the north-west Lac La Loche (Methye Lake) then Peter Pond Lake (Buffalo Lake) flow into Churchill Lake. Clearwater Lake (or Clear Lake) was renamed Churchill Lake in 1944 and Buffalo Lake was renamed Peter Pond Lake in 1932.

Fish Species 	
The lake's fish species include: walleye, sauger, yellow perch, northern pike, lake trout, lake whitefish, cisco, white sucker, longnose sucker and burbot.

See also 
List of lakes in Saskatchewan

References 

Lakes of Saskatchewan